Area code 620 covers telephone exchanges in most of southern Kansas. It was created as the result of a split from 316 on February 3, 2001. The area code stretches across the southern half of the state, from the Colorado border in the west to the Missouri border in the east. It completely surrounds 316, which now only serves Wichita and its inner suburbs, making it one of the six pairs of "doughnut area codes" in the numbering plan. Permissive dialing of 316 across southern Kansas continued until November 3, 2001.

The most populous cities covered by the area code are Dodge City, Garden City, Hutchinson and Pittsburg.

620 was created due to the growing proliferation of cell phones in the Wichita area. With the great majority of the old 316's landlines and cell phones located in the Wichita area, 620 is one of the most thinly populated area codes in the nation. Under the most recent projections, southern Kansas will not need another area code until about 2030.

Prior to October 2021, area code 620 had telephone numbers assigned for the central office code 988. In 2020, 988 was designated nationwide as a dialing code for the National Suicide Prevention Lifeline, which created a conflict for exchanges that permit seven-digit dialing. This area code was therefore scheduled to transition to ten-digit dialing by October 24, 2021.

Major cities in area code 620

 Arkansas City
 Caney
 Coffeyville
 Dodge City
 Emporia
 Fort Scott
 Frontenac
 Garden City
 Great Bend
 Hutchinson
 Liberal
 McPherson
 Pittsburg
 Pratt
 Independence
 Parsons
 Scott City
 Wellington
 Winfield

Boundaries of area code 620
The boundary between area codes 620 and 785 runs from west to east roughly following a path along K-4 and K-96.  The code boundary dips along I-135 in McPherson County and continues east to just north of Emporia in Lyon County along the Kansas Turnpike, where the boundaries of area codes 620, 785 and 913 meet. Area code 620 shares its northern boundary with area code 913's southern boundary, ending south of the Kansas City metropolitan area.

All of Sedgwick County, along with parts of Butler, Harvey, Kingman, Reno and Sumner counties, remain in area code 316.

References

External links

 Area Code History
 1947 Area Code Assignment Plan
 List of exchanges from AreaCodeDownload.com, 620 Area Code

620
620